Sainte-Thérèse-de-la-Gatineau is a municipality in the Outaouais region of Quebec, Canada. Located between the Gatineau River and Thirty-One Mile Lake, it is the smallest municipality in terms of population in the La Vallée-de-la-Gatineau Regional County Municipality.

History 
It takes its name from the Sainte-Thérèse-de-l'Enfant-Jésus Parish, formed in 1934, which in turn was named after Saint Thérèse of the Child Jesus (1873–1897).

In 1946, the Municipality of Sainte-Thérèse-de-la-Gatineau was formed when it separated from the Township of Cameron.

Demographics

Private dwellings occupied by usual residents: 288 (out of 534 total)

Languages:
French as first language: 89.7%

References

External links 

Incorporated places in Outaouais
Municipalities in Quebec